Bangaru Sankellu is a 1968 Telugu movie starring Haranath, Jamuna, Gummadi, Raja Babu, 
Rama Prabha, Radhika, Jyothika, Kamala Devi, Tilakam. Directed by G. Ramaneedu released on 1 November 1968.

External links
 https://indiancine.ma/documents/GHJ/0,0,2550,3300

1960s Telugu-language films
1968 films